"Sex, Lies and Alibis" is the second overall, episode of Pretty Little Liars: The Perfectionists. It aired on Freeform on March 27, 2019. It was written by I. Marlene King and directed by Elizabeth Allen Rosenbaum. The episode was watched live by 0.24 million viewers.

Plot
The episode picks up immediately following the events of the previous episode. Caitlin and Dylan begin panicking. The two begin putting their alibis together and are nervous due to Nolan being murdered in the same way as their fantasy. In addition, neither of them have heard from Ava who seems to be missing. It is later ruled that Nolan's death was a murder not a suicide. Mona feels responsible for Nolan's death and begins putting the pieces together. Alison has her own problems when she supposedly receives a text from Nolan.

Caitlin and Dylan find Ava in her room and the two convince her that they all need to stick together. At Nolan's funeral Mona tells Alison that there was a partial Beacon Guard blackout in cell service and that would explain the delayed text from Nolan. Following the funeral Caitlin, Dylan, and Ava run into Dana Booker, a former FBI agent now head of security at BHU, who assures them that she will find the person responsible for Nolan's murder. Alison begins suspecting that someone is trying to frame her for Nolan's murder. Caitlin and Dylan look for Nolan's secret stash to find things before his belongings are searched. Caitlin gets sidetracked in the process by former boyfriend Mason but Dylan continues on. In the campus greenhouse Dylan finds a note which leads him to believe that someone beat them to Nolan's stash.

Caitlin, Dylan, and Ava meet in the woods again and find evidence that they weren't alone the night they were out there. Alison meets with Dana who requests to read the essays she assigned over the topic "Can murder be justified?" just before Nolan's death. Alison returns home and is spooked by Claire who was waiting inside. Mona calls Hanna Marin who informs her that Spencer and Toby have eloped since Mona left Rosewood.

Dana interrupts Alison's class and requests to see Caitlin, Dylan, and Ava. Dana asks the three of them where they were the night of Nolan's murder but before they can answer Alison interrupts the interview and gives them an alibi.

Production

Development
I. Marlene King wrote the episode in September 2018 when she also revealed the title of the episode as "Sex, Lies and Alibis". Production on the episode began in October 2018. It was later revealed that Elizabeth Allen Rosenbaum would be directing, Larry Reibman served as the Director of Photography. Adam Reamer and Tara Johnson-Medinger were the episodes production designer and tech scout, respectively. The episode began filming on October 17 and concluded on October 26, 2018. Post-production began on November 4, 2018.

Casting
Klea Scott was cast as a guest star in the episode as Dana Booker, BHU's new head of security. Scott previously recurred as Jillian Howe in parent series Pretty Little Liars.

Reception

Viewing figures
"Sex, Lies and Alibis" was watched live by 0.24 million viewers, down from the previous episode.

Notes

References

External links
 

2019 American television episodes